Richard James Nelson (born May 20, 1986) is an American politician, engineer, and attorney currently serving in the Louisiana House of Representatives representing Louisiana's 89th district.

He is a candidate for governor of Louisiana in the 2023 election.

Early life and education 
Richard Nelson was born on May 20, 1986 in McAllen, Texas to Michael and Deborah Nelson. He is the second of four children.

Nelson graduated Valedictorian of Mandeville High School in 2004. While in high school, he also became an Eagle Scout.

Nelson graduated Summa Cum Laude from Louisiana State University in 2007 with a Bachelor of Science in Biological engineering. He graduated in the top of his class from Paul M. Hebert Law Center in 2010. Nelson was a member of the Louisiana Law Review and Order of the Coif.

Career 
After he graduated law school, Nelson joined the US Foreign Service as a Security Engineering Officer and diplomat. He served in Frankfurt, Germany, Tbilisi, Georgia, and Washington, D.C. while also leading projects in regions such as Afghanistan, Pakistan, Iraq, and Libya. During his career with the State Department, Nelson earned several awards including the Meritorious Honor Award and the Superior Honor Award.

Nelson resigned from the State Department in 2017 to take an executive role with a project management consulting firm in his hometown of Mandeville, Louisiana. He launched his own consulting company in 2020.

Nelson ran for State Representative in 2019 in a crowded, five-person nonpartisan primary election as one of four Republicans. He ran for office on the platform of eliminating the income tax in Louisiana. Nelson won in the run-off general election against a fellow Republican and was sworn into office on January 13, 2020.

Personal life 
Nelson and his wife, Ashley, have three sons.

References 

Republican Party members of the Louisiana House of Representatives
1986 births
Living people
People from McAllen, Texas
Louisiana State University alumni
Louisiana State University Law Center alumni
21st-century American diplomats
People from Mandeville, Louisiana
21st-century American politicians